Félix Rotaeta (1 April 1942 - 23 November 1994) was a Spanish actor, director, screenwriter and novelist.

Life and career 
Born in Madrid, Rotaeta studied journalism and drama, and started his career on stage, writing and performing with the fringe theatre company Los goliardos. He worked intensively as a character actor, and directed two feature films, El placer de matar (1987), based on his novel Las pistolas and starring Antonio Banderas and Victoria Abril, and Chatarra (1991), which was entered into the main competition at the 48th edition of the Venice Film Festival. 

In November 1994, while shooting an independent western film Rotoeta fell ill and died shortly later of a septic shock and a multiorgan failure, at the age of 52.

References

External links 
 

1944 births
1994 deaths
People from Madrid
Spanish screenwriters 
Spanish film directors 
Spanish film actors